The 2008 VFF Bred Cup was the qualifying competition for the 2008–09 OFC Champions League. The club who advanced to this tournament was Port Vila Sharks, Vanuatu's sole representative at the competition. The competition was played in two separate championships, north and south, with each winner and runners-up facing off in the overall finals.

Northern championship

Teams 
 AS Concorde
 Penama United
 Rainbow F.C. (winners)*
 Supa Maka (runners-up)*
 Torba United
* Qualified for the overall finals

Southern championship

Teams 
 Port Vila Mauriki
 Port Vila Sharks (winners)
 Shefa Kings United
 Tafea Hornets (runners-up)

Standings

Overall finals

Semi-finals 
Tafea Hornets advanced to the overall final.Port Vila Sharks advanced to the overall final.

Final 
Port Vila Sharks advance to the 2008–09 OFC Champions League.

References

2007–08 in Vanuatuan football
VFF National Super League seasons